Asian Stories (formerly known as Asian Stories (Book 3) is a 2006 American independent feature film directed by Ron Oda and Kris Chin and starring James Kyson Lee, Kirt Kishita, and Kathy Uyen.  Its running time is 98 minutes; it was shot in Super 16mm format.

Premise
Jim, a Chinese American Los Angeleno, borders on psychotic depression after he is abandoned by his bride-to-be two weeks before their Valentine's Day wedding.  His only solution to end his misery is to get his best friend, Alex, an ex-con hitman, to promise to kill him.  The two head for the hills, escaping to Jim's aunt's cabin, with the understanding Alex will fulfill his promise sometime before the approaching Hallmark holiday. With the plan in place, Jim finally seems at peace with his life - until he meets Amanda.

Cast 
James Kyson Lee as Jim Lee
Kirt Kishita as Alex
Kathy Uyen as Amanda
Lauren Mary Kim as Katherine
Luis Fernandez-Gil as Ed
Christopher Dinh as Minh Phuc
Eric Hailey  as Pizza Delivery Guy
Matt Witt as General Store Manager
Michelle Guest as Cocktail Waitress
Michelle Prenez as  Bar Patron
Kevin Stafford as Howard
Susie Heckendorn as Southern Bar Patron #1
Kira Gurnee  as Southern Bar Patron #2
Todd C. Smith as Southern Bar Patron #1
Dwayne Ward as Southern Bar Patron #2
C. William Chappell IV as Southern Bar Patron #3
Lang W. McDonald as The Rainbow Suspender Guy
Matt Braunger as Deli Customer
Katsuyuki “Katz” Ueno as Voice of Cook
Greg Bishop as Gangster #2
Heather Klinke as Bank Teller
Alan Achterberg as Pizza Guy’s Friend
Jonathan Hepburn as Amanda’s Ex-Boyfriend
Ruth Snyder as Bowling Alley Girl
Michelle Conry as Coffee Berry
Gabriel Lozano as Latin Male
Priscilla Soto as Latin Female
Mike Dalager as Gangster #3
Caesar as Kalbi The Dog

Film festivals 
 11th Chicago Asian American Film Showcase
 VC FilmFest 2006 Los Angeles Asian Pacific Film Festival—Audience Award
 3rd Annual Los Angeles Korean International Film Festival
 7th Annual San Diego Asian Film Festival
 26th Louis Vuitton Hawaii International Film Festival
 Austin Asian Film Festival 2006
 Vietnamese International Film Festival 2007
 2nd Annual DisOrient Asian American Film Festival of Oregon

References

External links 

Asian Stories Official Web Site

2006 films
Asian-American drama films
American comedy-drama films
2006 comedy-drama films
Films shot in 16 mm film
2000s English-language films
2000s American films